David Marrero and Santiago Ventura were the defending champions but decided not to participate.
Daniele Bracciali and Simone Vagnozzi won the final 3–6, 7–6(2), [10–7] against Daniele Giorgini and Adrian Ungur.

Seeds

Draw

Draw

External links
 Main Draw

Citta di Caltanissetta - Doubles
Città di Caltanissetta